Alfred Worcester (1855–1951) was a general practitioner in Waltham, Massachusetts, known for pioneering work in patient care, the treatment of appendicitis, and the use of Caesarean section.

Biography 
Alfred Worcester was born in Waltham on June 22, 1855.  He earned AB at Harvard College, Phi Beta Kappa, in 1878 and MD at Harvard Medical School in 1883.  He entered practice in Waltham in 1884 and founded the Waltham Hospital and Training School for Nurses the following year.  He married Elizabeth Joy Hill (1854–1951), the daughter of a former president of Harvard College, in 1886. They had no children. Other accomplishments included:  founded the Rutland Sanatorium (for care of tuberculosis), 1895; admonished the physicians of eastern Canada to allow the founding of the Victorian Order of Nurses, 1897; president of the Obstetrical Society of Boston, 1899; founded Waltham Baby Hospital, 1902; Major in American Red Cross, Switzerland, 1918–1919; president of the Massachusetts Medical Society 1919–1921; professor of hygiene, Harvard College, 1925–1935. He died August 28, 1951, and his wife died six days later at their home in Waltham.

Accomplishments 
He was called a pioneer in the organization, practice, training, and science of medical and nursing care.  He originated the concept of teaching about the care of the patient that would be applicable to all medical specialties. He was an early adopter of appendectomy for appendicitis and of Caesarean section for complicated labor. He advocated for compassionate medical care and counseling for college students and was Harvard College's second Professor of Hygiene. He was a prolific writer and speaker and was deeply religious. He gave lectures and sermons across the United States and Canada.

Because of his innovations, he was often involved in controversy.  He suffered several life-threatening illnesses, including appendicitis, which informed his approach to patient care.  Scientific medicine was on the rise while he advocated preserving humanistic medicine.  Including practical experience in home care during nurses' training, which he organized at the Waltham Training School for Nurses, was frowned upon by hospital-based nursing school administrators of the day.

APPENDECTOMY: In the 1880s, appendicitis was treated expectantly, by waiting for a walled-off abscess to form, with incision and drainage via anterior or posterior approach, and was often fatal.  The innovation that Worcester adopted was to operate earlier and earlier in the course of the disease and to enter the peritoneum to do so.  At first, this was by open lavage of the peritoneal cavity and removal of what was left of the ruptured appendix.  Later, he found that he could usually operate before the appendix had ruptured, and prevent generalized peritonitis and abscess formation, and greatly reduce morbidity and mortality.  The reports of his cases and the controversy between him and the surgeons of Boston demonstrate the evolution of medical and surgical practice and the contribution of generalists to specialty care.

GERIATRICS, PALLIATIVE CARE, PATIENT CARE:  Dr. Francis Peabody's noted statement, "the secret of the care of the patient is in caring for the patient," was delivered in a series of lectures initiated by Worcester.  Some of the lectures, including Worcester's on the care of the aged and the care of the dying, were published in a collection in 1929. Worcester's lectures were then published on their own in 1935, together with a third lecture on the care of the dead.   This book went into a second edition and several printings, the last being in 1977. Dame Cicely Saunders, the leader of the palliative care movement in the United Kingdom, was inspired by Worcester's book during her training.  In this book, Worcester states,

Worcester's consult on a case in a memoir of turn-of-the-century Malden, Massachusetts, includes this observation:

References

External links 
Waltham Historical Society
"First Patriots' Day, The: An Eyewitness Account By Dr. Alfred Worcester" – In 1950, Parker Wheatley, General Manager, Lowell Institute Cooperative Broadcasting Council, interviewed 95-year-old Worcester about his memory of his great-grandmother telling him, in about 1860, of the Battle of Lexington and Concord in 1775.
Painting of Worcester, 1928
Photo of Worcester
Photo of Worcester, c1878
Photo of Worcester, 1947
The Care of the Aged, the Dying, and the Dead
Reminiscences of Alfred Worcester 1938
Nurses for Our Neighbors
Small Hospitals: Establishment and Maintenance
Training Schools for Nurses in Small Cities
Monthly Nursing
History of Appendicitis

1855 births
1951 deaths
People from Waltham, Massachusetts
Harvard Medical School alumni
Physicians from Massachusetts